Aradus kormilevi, known generally as the "pine flat bug", is a species of flat bugs in the family Aradidae. It is found in North America.

References

 Henry, Thomas J., and Richard C. Froeschner, eds. (1988). Catalog of the Heteroptera, or True Bugs, of Canada and the Continental United States, xix + 958.

Further reading

 Arnett, Ross H. (2000). American Insects: A Handbook of the Insects of America North of Mexico. CRC Press.

Aradidae
Insects described in 1980